José Francisco Altur Gascón (born 24 March 1968) is a former professional tennis player from Spain.

Career

Pro tour
Altur won the 1989 San Marino Open, as a qualifier, although he didn't have to face a single top 100 player. It was his only tournament win on the ATP Tour.

He played 11 Grand Slam singles matches during his career, but lost them all. His most noteworthy efforts were taking a set off Jim Courier at the 1990 French Open and winning the opening set against Michael Chang at that year's Wimbledon.

Altur did however make it into the second round of the Men's Doubles at the 1990 Australian Open, his only Grand Slam appearance in that format. Partnering South African David Adams, they defeated the Spanish pairing of Jordi Arrese and Francisco Clavet.
 
His best performance in 1992 came at the Croatia Open, where he reached the quarterfinals.

In 1993 he made the semifinals of the BMW Open in Munich. Although he lost the first set, Altur was able to defeat world number five and top seed Petr Korda in the second round.

He made the quarterfinals of the U.S. Men's Clay Court Championships in 1994.

Coaching
Altur currently coaches Taro Daniel, whilst having previously coached David Ferrer and Igor Andreev.

Grand Prix career finals

Singles: 1 (1–0)

Challenger titles

Singles: (1)

Top 10 wins

References

1968 births
Living people
Spanish male tennis players
Sportspeople from Valencia
Tennis players from the Valencian Community